Hazel-Nash House, also known as the Hasell-Nash House, is a historic home located at Hillsborough, Orange County, North Carolina.  It was built about 1820, and consists of a two-story, three bay, pedimented central block flanked by a pair of pedimented single-story wings.  The front facade features a single-story porch supported by Ionic order columns and a central Palladian window.  Its design is probably based on Robert Morris (1703–1754) plate 37 of his Rural Architecture. (London, 1750).

It was listed on the National Register of Historic Places in 1971.  It is located in the Hillsborough Historic District.

References

External links

Historic American Buildings Survey in North Carolina
Houses on the National Register of Historic Places in North Carolina
Houses completed in 1820
Hillsborough, North Carolina
Houses in Orange County, North Carolina
National Register of Historic Places in Orange County, North Carolina
Individually listed contributing properties to historic districts on the National Register in North Carolina